Anomopera is a genus of ascidian tunicates in the family Molgulidae.

Species within the genus Anomopera include:
 Anomopera ingolfiana Hartmeyer, 1923

References

Stolidobranchia
Tunicate genera